Rossoshinsky is a rural locality (a khutor) and the administrative center of Rossoshinskoye Rural Settlement, Uryupinsky District, Volgograd Oblast, Russia. The population was 611 as of 2010. There are 7 streets.

Geography 
Rossoshinsky is located in steppe, 32 km southwest of Uryupinsk (the district's administrative centre) by road. Safonovsky is the nearest rural locality.

References 

Rural localities in Uryupinsky District